Radhika Umdekar Budhkar popularly known as Radhika Veena Sadhika is a vichitra veena player and veena teacher from Madhya Pradesh, India. She is the world's first woman vichitra veena player.

Biography
Radhika hails from a family of versatile musicians who migrated to Gwalior in Madhya Pradesh several generations ago. Her grandfather Balabhau Umdekar was a trained vocalist in Gwalior Gharana. He was also the court musician of Scindias, the rulers of the then princely state of Gwalior. Similarly, her father Shriram Umdekar who us an A-grade sitar and rudra veena player, used to play and teach sitar, surbahar and rudra veena. Radhika started learning music from her father. Her first vocal performance was as a child. She first studied classical vocal and sitar. By the time she was 12, she began to be known as a well known and famous sitar player, earning a double MA and several gold medals. A few years later, she all of a sudden had a vision and dream to learn a particular veena which was not played by women. After much research, she and her father got to know about the Vichitra Veena and there began her journey with the instrument. The Veena back then was very long and quite huge, it was extremely difficult to carry and travel with and because of its bulky physical appearance its sound was also quite squeaky. Due to these things, Many didn't learn the instrument. Radhika did want to be the first lady Vichitra Veena player but not the only Vichitra Veena Player. So she started with her new mission in order to give Vichitra Veena the spotlight it deserved. She and her father started working on the size of the Veena and the sound of the veena. Few years later, she made the veena small and made its sound very beautiful and enhanced. Later, she trained under mohan veena maestro Vishwa Mohan Bhatt. Currently she resides in Navi Mumbai, where she runs her Institute Veena Venu Art Foundation.

Musical career
Radhika started her music education by studying classical vocals and sitar and started focusing on vichitra veena in her early teens. She is recognized as the world's first woman vichitra veena player. Radhika was also one of the performers at the Saaz-e-Bahar at NCPA, the annual instrumental music festival organized by the National Center for the Performing Arts (NCPA). In an attempt to make vichitra veena more popular, Radhika also introduced a lighter and improvised version of the instrument. While the traditional vichitra veena is 5 feet long and weighs 5 kg, Radhika's version is only 48 inches long and weighs 2 kg.

Radhika has won many prestigious fellowships and scholarships and has performed at many major music festivals in India. Besides performances, she also teach veena at the Veena Venu Art Foundation at Navi Mumbai.

Awards and honors
Durlabh Sangeet Shaily scholarship from the Ustad Alauddin Khan Sangeet Academy, Bhopal
Scholarship from the Ministry of Tourism & Culture, Government of India

References

1982 births
Living people
Vichitra veena players
Indian percussionists
Indian women classical musicians
Women musicians from Madhya Pradesh
21st-century Indian women musicians